The sepia short-tailed opossum (Monodelphis adusta) is a species of opossum in the family Didelphidae found in Colombia, Ecuador, Panama, Peru and Venezuela.

Description 

The species has dark brown fur and is distinct from other members of its genus by having no streaks on its trunk.

Taxonomic Notes 

The  Peruvian short-tailed opossum (Monodelphis peruviana; Osgood, 1913) was at one point included under this species.

Ecology 

Its habitat consists of different types of forests up to 2200 meters above sea level, as well as grasslands. These areas have about 5 m annual rainfall, so they find ways to remain above the water. The opossum hunts invertebrates on the ground, but remains of beetles and small frogs have also been seen. They are nocturnal and live in tree holes.

References

Opossums
Mammals of Colombia
Mammals described in 1897
Taxa named by Oldfield Thomas
Taxonomy articles created by Polbot